A Tornwaldt cyst also spelt as Thornwaldt or Thornwald cyst is a benign cyst located in the upper posterior nasopharynx. It can be seen on computed tomography (CT) or magnetic resonance imaging (MRI) of the head as a well-circumscribed round mass lying in the midline. In most cases, treatment is not necessary. It was first described by Gustav Ludwig Tornwaldt.

See also
 Tornwaldt's disease

References

External links 

Cysts
Human throat